Appia may refer to:

Places
Appian Way (In Italian and Latin: Via Appia),  one of the earliest and strategically most important Roman roads of the ancient republic
Appia (Phrygia), a town and bishopric of ancient Phrygia, now in Turkey
Aqua Appia, the first ancient Roman aqueduct, constructed in 312 BC

People
Appia gens, family at ancient Rome
Adolphe Appia (1862–1928), Swiss architect and theorist of stage lighting and décor
Dominique Appia (1926–2017), Swiss painter who lived and worked in the city of Geneva
Louis Appia (1818–1898), surgeon with special merit in military medicine
Saint Appia (1st century AD), wife of Philemon, recipient of a letter from Paul the Apostle

Nature
Appia (skipper), genus of skipper butterflies in the family Hesperiidae

Other uses
Appia (software), free and open-source layered communication toolkit implemented in Java
Lancia Appia, car introduced in 1953 as a replacement for the Ardea, produced for 10 years

See also
 Appian (disambiguation)
 Appiah, Ghanaian surname
 Appias (genus), genus of butterflies
 Appias, naiad and one of the Crinaeae